Disability in Romania has long been a problem, especially for children, as there is the institutionalization of children with disabilities in Romania, as it is considered something that is shameful and must be hidden away.

Epidemiology 
In 2004, there were over 414,000 people with disabilities in Romania.

See also 
 Healthcare in Romania
 Health in Romania

References